William Thompson (born 2 January 1891, date of death unknown) was an Australian cricketer. He played in one first-class match for Queensland in 1914/15.

See also
 List of Queensland first-class cricketers

References

External links
 

1891 births
Year of death missing
Australian cricketers
Queensland cricketers
Cricketers from Queensland